Radyo Kahilwayan 106.7 (DYIS 106.7 MHz) is an FM station in the Philippines owned and operated by the Municipal Government of Santa Barbara. Its studios and transmitter are located along Merlo St., Santa Barbara, Iloilo.

History
The station was established in 2002 as ISCOF Radio, a college radio station of Iloilo State College of Fisheries. In 2016, it partnered with the Municipal Government of Santa Barbara & rebranded as Radyo Ugyon. In December 2019, the government acquired the station & rebranded as Radyo Kahilwayan. It is currently an affiliate of the Philippine Broadcasting Service.

References

External links
Radyo Kahilwayan FB Page

Radio stations in Iloilo
Radio stations established in 2002